Kwang-hyun Kim (Hangul: 김광현; born July 22, 1988) is a South Korean left-handed pitcher for the SSG Landers of KBO League. He has played in Major League Baseball (MLB) for the St. Louis Cardinals and in KBO for the SK Wyverns.

Amateur career
Kim attended Ansan Technical High School in Ansan, Gyeonggi-do, South Korea. In 2004, he led his team to the first national championship ever, pitching four-consecutive complete game victories in the tournament with a 0.96 ERA, and was named MVP.

Professional career

SK Wyverns (2007–2019) 
Signed by the SK Wyverns, Kim made his professional debut on April 10, 2007. He was in the Wyverns' starting pitching rotation for most of the 2007 KBO League season. Although his performance was inconsistent, he showed signs of promise as a rookie, including pitching a one-hit victory in 7 innings over the Doosan Bears, facing MVP Daniel Rios in the 2007 Korean Series.

In the 2008 season, Kim had a career year. He went 16–4 with a 2.39 ERA and 150 strikeouts in 162 innings pitched. Kim ended the season as the KBO League leader for both wins and strikeouts.

On August 2, 2009, Kim was hit with a batted ball hit by Kim Hyun-soo when he had one of the worst pitching performances in his KBO League career, allowing 4 runs in just 2 innings against the Doosan Bears. He suffered a fracture on the back of his hand and he was out for the season as the result. However, he won the 2009 ERA title, pitching 138.1 innings which enabled him enough to qualify for the ERA title.

On November 4, 2014, Kim was posted to MLB. The San Diego Padres won the bidding with a bid of $2 million. However, contract negotiations ended without an agreement and Kim returned to the SK Wyverns.

For the 2019 season, Kim went 17–6 with a 2.51 ERA and a 1.24 WHIP over 190.1 innings.

St. Louis Cardinals (2020–2021) 
On December 17, 2019, Kim signed a two-year contract worth $11 million (combined option $3 million) with the St. Louis Cardinals. The SK Wyverns received a $1.6 million posting fee.  When the start of the 2020 Major League Baseball season was delayed by the COVID-19 pandemic, Kim considered returning to Korea to be with his family. He was convinced, however, by Cardinals teammate Adam Wainwright to stay in the United States with the Cardinals.

On July 24, 2020, Kim made his MLB debut against the Pittsburgh Pirates, allowing 1 earned run over 1 inning of work. On August 22, he earned his 1st MLB win. Kim finished his first MLB season with a 3–0 record, 24 strikeouts and a 1.62 ERA.

In 2021, Kim appeared in 27 games (21 starts) and posted a 7–7 record with a 3.46 ERA, 80 strikeouts and 39 walks in  innings. He became a free agent following the season.

SSG Landers
On March 7, 2022, Kim signed a 4-year, $12.3M contract with the SSG Landers, returning to the KBO.

Awards and honors
2008 KBO MVP
2008 Golden Glove Award (Pitcher)

Achievements
2008 Wins Title
2008 Strikeouts Title
2009 ERA Title
2009 Winning Percentage Leader
2010 Wins Title

International career
In 2005, Kim was selected for the South Korea national junior team that was runner-up at the 6th Asian Junior Baseball Championship in Seoul, South Korea. He earned two wins against Chinese Taipei, and pitched a five-inning no-hitter against Japan.

In 2006, Kim competed for the South Korea national junior team in the 22nd World Junior Baseball Championship in Havana, Cuba. He led his team to the gold medal, earning four of South Korea's six wins. Kim tossed a five-hit complete game shutout to lead South Korea to a 1–0 victory over Chinese Taipei in the quarterfinals, and pitched two wins over Canada in the semifinals and USA in the final. He posted a solid 0.87 ERA and 22 strikeouts throughout the tournament, and was named the Most Valuable Player.

In January 2008, Kim was selected for the South Korea national baseball team and participated in the Beijing Olympic Qualification Final Tournament held from March 7 through March 14, 2008 in Taichung, Taiwan. There he helped his team win a spot in the Beijing Summer Olympics by starting two times and going 2–0 with a 1.64 ERA. At the 2008 Olympic Games, Kim contributed to his team's victories as results of 1–0 with a 1.26 ERA and 12 strike outs in 3 games. In the semifinal game against Japan, he gave up one earned run and six hits in eight innings for Korea to get the victory. Kim did not allow a runner past first base after the 3rd inning, when Japan scored on a walk, a sacrifice and a single by Norichika Aoki.

In March 2009, Kim competed for the South Korea national baseball team in the 2009 World Baseball Classic, where they finished runner-up. He started against Japan in South Korea's first game in Tokyo, Japan, but suffered one of his worst games, giving up eight runs in just 1.1 innings of a 14–2 loss to Japan. Kim couldn't get over the disastrous start in Tokyo, struggling in the exhibition games against MLB teams before the start of Round 2. Command of his pitches became a trouble spot, and Team Korea manager Kim In-sik pitched him in relief until the end of the competition.

Pitching style
With an overhand delivery, Kim pitches a fastball averaging 91–92 mph (tops out at 96 mph) as a starter. His slider is considered above-average and usually sits around 85 mph. He also has a curveball and a forkball. When Kim was young, he struggled with his control and command. However, in 2018, he had improved his control and also his command.

See also 
 List of KBO career win leaders
 List of KBO career strikeout leaders

References

External links 

Career statistics and player information from Korea Baseball Organization

1988 births
Living people
Asian Games gold medalists for South Korea
Asian Games medalists in baseball
Baseball players at the 2008 Summer Olympics
Baseball players at the 2014 Asian Games
Baseball players from Seoul
KBO League Most Valuable Player Award winners
KBO League pitchers
Major League Baseball pitchers
Major League Baseball players from South Korea
Medalists at the 2008 Summer Olympics
Medalists at the 2014 Asian Games
Olympic baseball players of South Korea
Olympic gold medalists for South Korea
Olympic medalists in baseball
SSG Landers players
South Korean expatriate baseball players in the United States
St. Louis Cardinals players
2009 World Baseball Classic players
2015 WBSC Premier12 players
2019 WBSC Premier12 players
2023 World Baseball Classic players